Manfred Degen (13 October 1939 – 24 September 2022) was a German politician. A member of the Social Democratic Party of Germany, he served in the Landtag of North Rhine-Westphalia from 1990 to 2005.

Degen died on 24 September 2022, at the age of 82.

References

1939 births
2022 deaths
20th-century German politicians
21st-century German politicians
Members of the Landtag of North Rhine-Westphalia
Members of the Order of Merit of North Rhine-Westphalia
Social Democratic Party of Germany politicians
Reichsgau Danzig-West Prussia
People from Elbląg
Recipients of the Cross of the Order of Merit of the Federal Republic of Germany